Goba Secondary School is a public secondary school located  in Goba ward of Ubungo District in Dar es Salaam Region, Tanzania. It is located at Kinzudi street about 7 km from Bagamoyo mainroad at Tangibovu.

References

Educational institutions established in 2006
Kinondoni District
Secondary schools in Tanzania
2006 establishments in Tanzania